Sheaves is the plural of either of two nouns:

 Sheaf (disambiguation)
 Sheave